In geometry, the great rhombic triacontahedron is a nonconvex isohedral, isotoxal polyhedron. It is the dual of the great icosidodecahedron (U54). Like the convex rhombic triacontahedron it has 30 rhombic faces, 60 edges and 32 vertices (also 20 on 3-fold and 12 on 5-fold axes).

This solid is to the compound of great icosahedron and great stellated dodecahedron what the convex one is to the compound of dodecahedron and icosahedron:
The crossing edges in the dual compound are the diagonals of the rhombs.

What resembles an "excavated" rhombic triacontahedron (compare excavated dodecahedron and excavated icosahedron) can be seen within the middle of this compound. The rest of the polyhedron strikingly resembles a rhombic hexecontahedron.

Its dihedral angles equal . Part of each rhomb lies inside the solid, hence is invisible in solid models. The ratio between the lengths of the long and short diagonal of the rhombs equals the golden ratio .

References

External links
 
 David I. McCooey: animation and measurements
 Uniform polyhedra and duals

Dual uniform polyhedra